Néstor Isaías Chávez Silva (July 6, 1947 - March 16, 1969) was a Venezuelan right-handed starting pitcher who played in Major League Baseball for the San Francisco Giants in 1967.

Career
Chávez was born on July 6, 1947, in Chacao, Miranda State, Venezuela. He was signed as an amateur free agent in 1964 after producing a 34–3 record at the college. Chávez was nicknamed "Látigo" (whip) in his homeland, both for his stunning and sharp fastball.

At 19, he was called up to the big club after a combined 47–20 mark in the minors. In two games with the Giants, he compiled a 1–0 record with three strike outs and a 0.00 ERA in five innings. After the season, he had shoulder surgery and was sidelined for more than a year.

Chávez was ready to start his rehabilitation in the minors in 1969. On March 16 of that year, Chávez died in Maracaibo, Zulia State, in one of the worst aircraft tragedies in Venezuelan history, after Viasa Flight 742 struck power lines while taking off, killing all 84 aboard and 71 on the ground. He was 21 years old.

See also
 List of baseball players who died during their careers
 List of Major League Baseball players from Venezuela

References

External links

Néstor Chávez at SABR (Baseball BioProject)
Venezuelan Professional Baseball League career statistics
Home Page (in Spanish)

1947 births
1969 deaths
Decatur Commodores players
Estrellas Orientales (VPBL) players
Major League Baseball pitchers
Major League Baseball players from Venezuela
Navegantes del Magallanes players
People from Miranda (state)
Phoenix Giants players
San Francisco Giants players
Springfield Giants players
Venezuelan expatriate baseball players in the United States
Victims of aviation accidents or incidents in 1969
Victims of aviation accidents or incidents in Venezuela
Waterbury Giants players